Faustine et le Bel Été is a 1972 French romantic drama film directed by Nina Companéez. It was screened out of competition at the 1972 Cannes Film Festival.

Plot
Faustine, a romantic teenager, decides to spend her summer in the countryside with her grandparents. Upon her arrival she briefly meets a teenager named Joachim and quickly becomes obsessed with his family, spying on them from a distance.

Eventually she begins to integrate herself in to their lives, befriending Joachim's cousins, flirting with Joachim himself and developing a crush on his uncle.

Cast
 Muriel Catalá - Faustine
 Claire Vernet - Claire
 Jacques Spiesser - Florent
 Francis Huster - Joachim
 Georges Marchal - Julien
 Isabelle Adjani - Camille
 Marianne Eggerickx - Ariane
 Maurice Garrel - Jean
 Jacques Weber - Haroun
 Valentine Varela - Marie
 Nathalie Baye - Giselle
 Pierre Plessis - Henri, the Grandfather
 Andrée Tainsy - The Grandmother
 Virginie Thévenet - Student 1
 Isabelle Huppert - Student #2
 César Torres - Haroun's Friend

See also
 Isabelle Huppert on screen and stage

References

External links

1972 films
1972 romantic drama films
French romantic drama films
1970s French-language films
Films directed by Nina Companéez
1970s French films